The 2006 North Dakota State Bison football team represented North Dakota State University in the 2006 NCAA Division I FCS football season. The Bison head coach is Craig Bohl, in his fourth season as head coach of the team. The Bison play at the Fargodome in Fargo, North Dakota. North Dakota State competes in the FCS division of college football. In 2006, the Bison finished with a record of 10–1, and were the conference champions at 4–0. While being ranked #4 at the end of the year, NDSU was ineligible to make the playoffs per NCAA Division I rules which mandates a four-year probationary period for new football programs (NDSU entered DI in 2004).

The 2006 Bison team had a stout defense that held their opponents to 13.4 points per game and were ranked among the top teams to end the year.

Schedule

References

North Dakota State
North Dakota State Bison football seasons
Great West Conference football champion seasons
North Dakota State Bison football